Benjamin Reifel (September 19, 1906 – January 2, 1990), also known as Lone Feather (Lakota: Wíyaka Waŋžíla), was a Lakota Sioux public administrator and politician. He had a career with the Bureau of Indian Affairs, retiring as area administrator.  He ran for the US Congress from the East River region of South Dakota, and was elected as the first Lakota to serve in the House of Representatives. He served five terms as a Republican United States Congressman from the (now obsolete) First District.

Born on the Rosebud Indian Reservation, Reifel graduated from South Dakota State University.  During World War II he  achieved the rank of lieutenant colonel. He worked for the Department of the Interior beginning in 1933, retiring as the Aberdeen, South Dakota area administrator of the Bureau of Indian Affairs in March 1960. Awarded a mid-career fellowship in public administration to Harvard University for a master's degree, he went on to earn his PhD in 1952. Elected to the Eighty-seventh Congress and to the four succeeding Congresses (January 3, 1961 – January 3, 1971), Reifel chose not to run in 1970.

Early life and education
Reifel was born in a log cabin near Parmelee, South Dakota, on the Rosebud Indian Reservation. He was the son of Lucy Burning Breast, a Lakota Sioux, and William Reifel, of German descent. Ben Reifel was enrolled in the Rosebud Sioux Tribe and his Lakota name means "Lone Feather" in English.  He attended a Todd County school as well as the Rosebud Reservation boarding school as a child. He graduated at the age of sixteen from the eighth grade, speaking both English and Lakota.

For three years Reifel worked on his family's farm before entering the School of Agriculture, a vocational high school in Brookings, South Dakota. After finishing high school in 1928, Reifel enrolled at South Dakota State College. He paid his own tuition for his first four years of schooling. He took out one of the first loans offered to Native American students under a Merriam Report-recommended Indian education program. Reifel graduated with a B.S. in agriculture in 1932. He was elected the President of the Students' Association during his senior year.

Career
Following his graduation in 1932, Reifel was hired by Hare's School in Mission, South Dakota as an adviser for boys. He began working at the Bureau of Indian Affairs (BIA) in 1933; he was assigned to the Pine Ridge Indian Reservation as a farm agent to the Oglala Lakota. After a year, he was promoted to field agent at the Pierre, South Dakota regional headquarters.

Reifel's duties included promoting the new programs of the Indian Reorganization Act, signed by President Franklin D. Roosevelt in 1934. Allotment of reservation lands was ended, to enable tribes to hold communal lands and better preserve their territories.  Under the new law, tribes could reorganize self governments.  They were encouraged to write constitutions and to use models of elected government proposed by the BIA, rather than the life chiefs previously supported by the clans.

The American Indian people had endured hard times during the Great Depression, as well as the drought that caused Dust Bowl conditions in some parts of the Great Plains. Reifel was largely successful in garnering support for the Act. He started at Pine Ridge and later made his way to other reservations in South Dakota, ensuring that the programs of the Bureau were effective in the South Dakota reservations.

World War II
Reifel's BIA career was interrupted by World War II. In 1931, he had been commissioned as a second lieutenant in the United States Army Reserve. In March 1942, the Army ordered Reifel to active duty, and he served until July 1946.  He was promoted to the rank of lieutenant colonel.

Postwar career
After being discharged, Reifel continued working for the BIA. He was selected as a Tribal Relations Officer and later promoted to the position as Superintendent of the Fort Berthold Indian Reservation in North Dakota.

Harvard
In 1949 Reifel was awarded a scholarship to study public administration at Harvard University under a Civil Service Commission program for management development of career government officials. He earned his master's degree in 1949.  He received a John Hay Whitney Foundation Opportunity Fellowship and completed his Doctorate in Public Administration in 1952.  Following his graduation, Reifel returned to the BIA.

He worked briefly at its national headquarters in Washington, D.C. before returning to the Fort Berthold Indian Reservation as Superintendent. Reifel later served as Superintendent at the Pine Ridge Indian Reservation.

In 1955 he was promoted as the Area Director of the Aberdeen Area Office in Aberdeen, South Dakota. He was responsible for numerous employees and the application of federal programs and policies for American Indians of a three-state region: Nebraska, North Dakota and South Dakota. He served as administrator up until three years before his retirement.

Political career

In 1960, Reifel retired from the BIA and ran for Congress in South Dakota's 1st congressional district. At the time it included all of the counties east of the Missouri River, colloquially known as East River.  (The district was redrawn in 1931 to include 21 counties in the southeast part of the state.) Reifel was elected by a substantial margin; he was the first person of Lakota or Sioux descent to serve in the US Congress. During the 1960s, he was the only American Indian in Congress.  He served for five terms as Representative from South Dakota. Regarded as a "conservative Republican," he was a thinker who prepared himself well on legislative matters. He could always give a substantial and thoughtful basis for his stand on issues.

In Congress Reifel held several committee assignments. In his first term, he was appointed to the House Agricultural Committee; in his second, to the House Committee on Appropriations. He served as the ranking Republican on the House Appropriations subcommittee on Interior Department Affairs.
He worked hard for farming interests in South Dakota and the Plains states in general, opposing cuts in farm support programs, pushing the Oahe Dam to supply water for irrigation, and similar matters.

At the same time, he continued to work vigorously for American Indian education, with significant accomplishments. Opposing segregation, he believed that the key to ending the isolation of the Native American people was in educational programs that enrolled American Indian and non-Indian students together in modern progressive facilities (as was recommended by the 1928 Merriam Report), rather than keeping children in Indian-only boarding schools. Reifel supported the Civil Rights Act of 1968 and an increase in the minimum wage.

Reifel was instrumental in getting the Center for Earth Resources Observation and Science (EROS) of the US Geological Survey located in South Dakota.  In addition, he gained support to keep Ellsworth Air Force Base as an active military base in the state. On a broader national level, he was instrumental in securing passage of legislation to create the National Endowment for the Humanities and the National Arts Council.

In 1970 Reifel decided not to seek reelection. While he intended to retire in 1971, he remained active, accepting an appointment by President Richard Nixon as chair of the National Capital Planning Commission, which has oversight over federal projects in the Washington, DC metropolitan area.  He next served as Special Assistant for Indian programs to the Director of the National Park Service in the Department of the Interior. He also served as Interim Commissioner of Indian Affairs during the last two months of the Ford administration.

Later years
Throughout the 1960s and 1970s, Reifel was a member of the Masons, Rotarians, and Elks. He also served on the National Council of the Protestant Episcopal Church and the National Council of the Boy Scouts of America. He also served as national president of Arrow, Inc., a Native American service organization.

In 1977, Reifel became a trustee of the South Dakota Art Museum in Brookings. He served terms as the board president in 1982–83. He established the first Native American collection at the Art Museum in 1977, donating most of his personal collection.

Legacy and honors
1956, Outstanding American Indian Award.
1960, awarded the Annual Indian Achievement Award from the Indian Council Fire.
1960, received the Silver Antelope Award from the Boy Scouts of America, as well as the Gray Wolf, Silver Buffalo and Silver Beaver Awards in Scouting.
1961, received the Distinguished Service Award from the Department of the Interior for his career with the BIA.
The Ben Reifel Visitor Center in Badlands National Park was named in his honor.
Reifel received honorary doctorates from South Dakota State University, the University of South Dakota, and Northern State College.
A dorm on the South Dakota State University Campus was named after him and opened in 2015.
2018, becomes the namesake of a new middle school which is a part of the Sioux Falls School District.

Marriage and family 
On December 26, 1933, Reifel married his college sweetheart, Alice Janet Johnson of Erwin, South Dakota. They had a daughter, Loyce Nadine Reifel.  She married Emery Andersen. Alice Reifel died of pneumonia on February 8, 1972.

Ben Reifel remarried on August 14, 1972 to Frances Colby of DeSmet, South Dakota. He died of cancer on January 2, 1990.

See also
 List of Native Americans in the United States Congress
 List of Native American politicians

References

External links

 "Benjamin Reifel Papers", Archives, Library of South Dakota State University

1906 births
1990 deaths
People from Todd County, South Dakota
People from Rosebud Indian Reservation, South Dakota
Rosebud Sioux people
American people of German descent
Native American members of the United States Congress
Republican Party members of the United States House of Representatives from South Dakota
Politicians from Aberdeen, South Dakota
20th-century American politicians
South Dakota State University alumni
Harvard Kennedy School alumni
Native American United States military personnel
United States Army personnel of World War II
Deaths from cancer in South Dakota
Members of the United States House of Representatives from South Dakota